The 2022–23 season is the 124th season of the English Football League (EFL) and the seventh season under that name after it was renamed from The Football League in 2016. For the tenth season running, the league is sponsored by Sky Betting & Gaming and is therefore known as the Sky Bet EFL.

The EFL is contested through three divisions: the Championship, League One and League Two. The winner and the runner up of the Championship are automatically promoted to the Premier League and they are joined by the winner of the Championship playoff. The bottom two teams in League Two are relegated to the National League.

Promotion and relegation

From the Premier League
 Relegated to the Championship
 Burnley
 Watford
 Norwich City

From the Championship
 Promoted to the Premier League
 Fulham
 Bournemouth
 Nottingham Forest

 Relegated to League One
 Peterborough United
 Derby County
 Barnsley

From League One
 Promoted to the Championship
 Wigan Athletic
 Rotherham United
 Sunderland

 Relegated to League Two
 Gillingham
 Doncaster Rovers
 AFC Wimbledon
 Crewe Alexandra

From League Two
 Promoted to League One
 Forest Green Rovers
 Exeter City
 Bristol Rovers
 Port Vale

 Relegated to the National League
 Oldham Athletic
 Scunthorpe United

From the National League
 Promoted to League Two
 Stockport County 
 Grimsby Town

Championship

Table

Results

League One

Table

Results

League Two

Table

Results

Managerial changes

References

 
2022-23